77 (seventy-seven) is the natural number following 76 and preceding 78. Seventy-seven is the smallest positive integer requiring five syllables in English.

In mathematics
77 is:

the 22nd discrete semiprime and the first of the (7×q) family.
a Blum integer since both 7 and 11 are Gaussian primes.
the sum of three consecutive squares, 42 + 52 + 62.
the sum of the first eight prime numbers.
the number of integer partitions of the number 12.
 the largest number that cannot be written as a sum of distinct numbers whose reciprocals sum to 1.
the number of digits of the 12th perfect number.

It is possible for a sudoku puzzle to have as many as 77 givens, yet lack a unique solution.

It and 49 are the only 2-digit numbers whose home primes (in base 10) have not been calculated.

In science
The atomic number of iridium
The boiling point of nitrogen (in kelvins)
The temperature, in Fahrenheit, some characteristics of semiconductors are specifically given in a datasheet (77 °F = 25 °C).

In history
During World War II in Sweden at the border with Norway, "77" was used as a shibboleth (password), because the tricky pronunciation in Swedish made it easy to instantly discern whether the speaker was native Swedish, Norwegian, or German.

In religion
In the Islamic tradition, "77" figures prominently. Muhammad is reported to have explained, "Faith has sixty-odd, or seventy-odd branches, the highest and best of which is to declare that there is no god but God, and the lowest of which is to remove something harmful from a road. Shyness, too, is a branch of faith." While some scholars refrain from clarifying "sixty-odd or seventy-odd", various numbers have been suggested, 77 being the most common. Some have gone so far as to delineate these branches.

The Gospel of Luke lists 77 generations from Adam to Jesus.
In the Gospel of Matthew Peter asks, "How many times shall I forgive my brother?". Jesus replies, "Seventy-seven times." However this was not intended as literal quantitative instruction. Additionally, depending on the manuscript used for a given New Testament eclectic translation, the result is 77 or 490 (70*7) as it is seen in the King James Version.

In the Book of Genesis, Chapter 4,  Lamech says to his wives, "hear my voice..hearken unto my speech; for I have slain a man for wounding me, and a young man for bruising me; If Cain shall be avenged sevenfold, truly Lamech seventy and sevenfold."

In religious numerology
In certain numerological systems based on the English alphabet, the number 77 is associated with Jesus Christ. CHRIST is C = 3, H = 8, R = 18, I = 9, S = 19, T = 20, which added together equal 77.

'Liber 77' is the gematrian name for Liber OZ- a brief but popular publication by Aliester Crowley. The word 'oz', which means 'strength', is composed of two Hebrew letters- ayin and zayin, which have gematrian values of 70 and 7 respectively, thus adding up to 77.

In other fields

Seventy-seven is also:
 10-77, the New York City Fire Department's (FDNY) 10 code for high-rise, multiple-dwelling fire
 Shortening of a 1950s-60s TV series, 77 Sunset Strip
 Group of 77, a group of developing nations at the United Nations
 Talking Heads: 77, Talking Heads' debut album, released in 1977
 American Airlines Flight 77, one of the planes hijacked during the September 11 terrorist attacks in 2001
 The 77's, an American Rock band

References

External links

Integers